Amycus Probe is a 1981 role-playing game adventure for Traveller published by Judges Guild.

Plot summary
Amycus Probe is an adventure that concerns the investigation of an alien installation discovered on the undeveloped planet Amycus in the Osiris Deep subsector.

Publication history
Amycus Probe was written by Dave Sering and was published in 1981 by Judges Guild as a 32-page book.

Reception
William A. Barton reviewed Amycus Probe in The Space Gamer No. 47. Barton commented that "I recommend that if Amycus Probe is used, it be used in the campaign version and not as a one-time scenario. Provided that the latter adventures in the series carry through on the theme, it could form the basis of an interesting campaign situation."

References

Judges Guild publications
Role-playing game supplements introduced in 1981
Traveller (role-playing game) adventures